The Rwandan Cup  is the top knockout tournament of the Rwandan football. It was created in 1975.

Winners

Records and statistics

Performances by club

Performance by province

Performance by city

References

External links
List of cup winners at RSSSF.com
Rwanda: APR FC Are 2017 Peace Cup Champions
Rwanda : 2017 Rwanda Peace Cup Final
Mukura are Cup kings!
Federation Rwandaise de Football Association

Football competitions in Rwanda
National association football cups
Recurring sporting events established in 1975
1975 establishments in Rwanda